Kennington was a borough constituency centred on the Kennington district of South London.  It returned one Member of Parliament (MP) to the House of Commons of the Parliament of the United Kingdom.

The constituency was created for the 1885 general election, and abolished for the 1950 general election.

In 1918 Alice Theresa Lucas became the first woman to stand as a Conservative party candidate. She took  32.2% of the vote and came second to the Liberal candidate Henry Purchase. She would have been the first woman MP if she had been elected.

Members of Parliament

Election results

Elections in the 1940s

Elections in the 1930s

Elections in the 1920s

Elections in the 1910s

Elections in the 1900s

Elections in the 1890s

Elections in the 1880s

References 

Parliamentary constituencies in London (historic)
Constituencies of the Parliament of the United Kingdom established in 1885
Constituencies of the Parliament of the United Kingdom disestablished in 1950
History of the London Borough of Lambeth
Politics of the London Borough of Lambeth